A three-letter acronym (TLA), or three-letter abbreviation, is an abbreviation consisting of three letters. These are usually the initial letters of the words of the phrase abbreviated, and are written in capital letters (upper case); three-letter abbreviations such as etc. and Mrs. are not three-letter acronyms, but "TLA"  is a TLA (an example of an autological abbreviation).

Most three-letter abbreviations are not, strictly, acronyms, but rather initialisms: all the letters are pronounced as the names of letters, as in APA  . Some are true acronyms, pronounced as a word: as with computed axial tomography, for example, CAT is almost always pronounced as the animal's name in "CAT scan". Even the initialisms are however considered three-letter acronyms, because that term appeared first in widespread use, and is overwhelmingly popular today.

Examples

 Countries: SRI, United States, CAR, UAE, DRC, etc.
 Famous people: FDR, JFK, MLK, OBL, RBG, RDJ and MJK Computer phrases: CPU, DOS, RAM, ROM, and GNU File extensions: JPG, PDF, and XLS Corporations: BMW, IBM, AMD  and NEC Currency: USD, GBP, and CHF Business: CEO, CFO and other C-level officers
 Three Letter Agencies: CIA, FBI, CBI, FSB, and NSA Television networks: ABC (Aus., U.S.), BBC (UK), CBC (Canada, Japan), and NHK (Japan) 
 Personal advertisements: SBM for Single Black Male, STR for Short Term Relationship
 Chemistry, biology, pharmaceuticals: GMO, LSD and MSG Religion: LDS, SBC and SDA Clinical medicine: CAD and CHF Communications shorthand: LOL and OMG Military and weaponry: BFR and RPG Wars and political conflicts: HYW and WWI IATA airport codes: LAX and LHR Academic testing: ACT, SAT Musical groups: R.E.M., XTC, TLC, E.L.O., MC5, GBH, O.A.R., MDC, D.R.I., JFA Canine registries: AKC and CKC Sports organizations: NFL, MLB, (North America); AFL and NRL (Australia); NPB (Japan); ACB, LFP (Spain); IPL (India), EPL (England), WBOShip prefixes: HMS, USS and RMS State postal abbreviations: NSW, QLD, VIC and TAS (Australia)
 Political Parties: BJP, CCP, GOP and AAP'Air Navigation Services (ANS): SAR, AIS, FPC, ATM, MET, CNS, ASM, ATS, ATC, FIS

History and origins

The exact phrase three-letter acronym'' appeared in the sociology literature in 1975. Three-letter acronyms were used as mnemonics in biological sciences, from 1977 and their practical advantage was promoted by Weber in 1982. They are used in many other fields, but the term TLA is particularly associated with computing.  In 1980, the manual for the Sinclair ZX81 home computer used and explained TLA. The specific generation of three-letter acronyms in computing was mentioned in a JPL report of 1982. In 1988, in a paper titled "On the Cruelty of Really Teaching Computing Science", eminent computer scientist Edsger W. Dijkstra wrote (disparagingly), 
"No endeavour is respectable these days without a TLA" By 1992 it was in a Microsoft handbook.

Combinatorics

The number of possible three-letter abbreviations using the 26 letters of the alphabet from A to Z (AAA, AAB ... to ZZY, ZZZ) is 26 × 26 × 26 = 17,576. An additional 26 × 26 × 10 = 6760 can be produced for each single position allowed to be a digit 0-9, such as 2FA, P2P, or WW2, giving a total of 37,856 such three-character strings.

In standard English, WWW is the TLA whose pronunciation requires the most syllables—typically nine. The usefulness of TLAs typically comes from its being quicker to say than the phrase it represents; however saying 'WWW' in English requires three times as many syllables as the phrase it is meant to abbreviate (World Wide Web). "WWW" is sometimes abbreviated to "dubdubdub" in speech.

References in popular culture
 As early as 1967, the musical Hair included the song "Initials", whose final verse consisted only of TLAs, viz: "LBJ IRT United States LSD. LSD LBJ FBI CIA. FBI CIA LSD LBJ."
 In 1999, the author Douglas Adams remarked: "The World Wide Web is the only thing I know of whose shortened form takes three times longer to say than what it's short for."
 According to the Jargon File, a journalist once asked hacker Paul Boutin what he thought the biggest problem in computing in the 1990s would be. Paul's straight-faced response was: "There are only 17,000  three-letter acronyms."
 The Jargon File also mentions the abbreviation "ETLA" for "extended three-letter acronym" to refer to four-letter acronyms/abbreviations. "Extended three-letter acronym" is sometimes abbreviated to "XTLA".
 In the comic strip Dilbert the title character is working on a project called TTP.  The initials stand for  'The TTP Project.'   This is also an example of a recursive acronym.

See also

 ISO 4217 (currency code)
 List of acronyms
 List of airports by IATA code
 List of computing and IT abbreviations
 
 List of three-letter broadcast call signs in the United States
 Photographers' abbreviations
 Q code
 RAS syndrome
 Acronym
 Alphabet Agencies

References

Abbreviations
 T